Cody Wild (born June 5, 1987) is an American former professional ice hockey defenseman.

Playing career
Wild was born in Limestone, Maine, however, he grew up in North Providence, Rhode Island and attended North Providence High School. Wild was selected in the 5th Round (140th overall) by the Edmonton Oilers in the 2006 NHL Entry Draft. Wild played college hockey for three years for the Providence College Friars until he left after his junior season to sign with Edmonton Oilers.

On March 2, 2010, the Edmonton Oilers traded Wild to the Boston Bruins for Matt Marquardt.

On August 5, 2013, Wild signed as a free agent to a one-year contract with ECHL club, the Orlando Solar Bears.

On July 2, 2014, Wild signed his first contract abroad in the United Kingdom agreeing to a one-year contract with the Nottingham Panthers of the EIHL.

Career statistics

Awards and honors

References

External links

1987 births
Living people
American men's ice hockey defensemen
Edmonton Oilers draft picks
Hamilton Bulldogs (AHL) players
Ice hockey people from Maine
Ice hockey players from Rhode Island
Nottingham Panthers players
Orlando Solar Bears (ECHL) players
People from Limestone, Maine
People from North Providence, Rhode Island
Providence Bruins players
Providence Friars men's ice hockey players
Reading Royals players
Springfield Falcons players
Stockton Thunder players
Wheeling Nailers players
Wilkes-Barre/Scranton Penguins players